Nosedive or nose dive may refer to:
Nosedive (aeronautics), a nose-forward dive of an aircraft
"Nosedive" (Black Mirror), an episode of Black Mirror
 "Nosedive", a song by Dynamic Duo featuring Chen
 Nosedive, a character in Mighty Ducks
"The Nose Dive", a sketch in the Ukrainian TV series Calambur